Víctor Cervantes (born 22 August 1948) is a Mexican rower. He competed in the men's coxed eight event at the 1968 Summer Olympics.

References

External links
 

1948 births
Living people
Mexican male rowers
Olympic rowers of Mexico
Rowers at the 1968 Summer Olympics
Rowers from Mexico City